Graham Laurence Shaw (9 July 1934 – 12 May 1998) was an English professional footballer who played as a left-back. He notably represented Sheffield United between 1951 and 1967.

Career
Born in Sheffield, Shaw was developed by local amateur side Oaks Fold, after having played for Sheffield Schoolboys at half-back. He signed a professional contract with Sheffield United in 1951, at the age of seventeen and made his debut for the Blades against fierce rivals Sheffield Wednesday at Hillsborough on 5 January 1952 before a crowd of 65,384; United won the match 3–1.

Shaw would make in excess of 400 appearances for United over the following sixteen years; however, he found first-team opportunities limited after 1965, and in 1967 moved to Doncaster Rovers. He stayed at Doncaster for one season before joining Scarborough as their player-manager. Shaw managed Scarborough for one season, leaving the club in 1969.

Shaw died in 1998. He was the elder brother of Bernard Shaw, the Sheffield United, Wolves, and Sheffield Wednesday full back. He was not related to Joe Shaw, a long-time Sheffield United and England defensive colleague.

International career
At international level, Shaw won five caps for the England national side. His first cap came against the U.S.S.R. at Wembley on 22 October 1958, in a match England won 5–0. He made his last appearance for his country in 1962.

Playing style
Shaw was known as 'a calm, stylish player, who had pace and tackled well and could place his clearances'.

References

External links
 

1934 births
1998 deaths
England international footballers
England under-23 international footballers
English footballers
Scarborough F.C. managers
Sheffield United F.C. players
Footballers from Sheffield
English Football League players
English Football League representative players
Doncaster Rovers F.C. players
English football managers
Scarborough F.C. players
Association football defenders